Red Lights is a 1923 American silent mystery film directed by Clarence G. Badger and starring Marie Prevost, Raymond Griffith and Johnnie Walker. The plot concerns a railroad tycoon who is about to be reunited with his daughter who was kidnapped many years ago.

Plot
Most of the film takes place on a moving train. A psychic named Sheridan Scott professes to have the ability to foresee and prevent criminal acts. He agrees to help Ruth Carson, the daughter of a wealthy railroad magnate, solve a mystery regarding why flashing red lights over her head portend death for various people around her. Ruth had been kidnapped years earlier, and was later found and reunited with her father. The young heroine comes to believe her long-deceased uncle is menacing her from the beyond, but Scott solves the mystery of the flashing red lights, and learns the true identity of the man behind a plot to murder the young heiress and steal her inheritance...a scientist who uses telepathy to frighten the young woman.

Cast
Marie Prevost as Ruth Carson 
Raymond Griffith as Sheridan Scott 
Johnnie Walker as John Blake 
Alice Lake as Norah O'Neill 
Dagmar Godowsky as Roxy 
William Worthington as Luke Carson 
Frank Elliott as Kirk Allen 
Lionel Belmore as Alden Murray 
Jean Hersholt as Ezra Carson 
George Reed as Porter 
Charles Murphy as The Henchman 
Charles West as The Conductor 
Martha Mattox as Secretary

Production
The film is based on a play called The Rear Car by Edward E. Rose, but according to critic Christopher Workman, "the film is not very faithful to its source material....it's a moderately enjoyable ride regardless."  The film's survival status is unknown.

The play was filmed again in 1934 as Murder in the Private Car, starring Charles Ruggles as the psychic detective, although in that version, the supernatural elements were played down a bit. Actor Lionel Belmore went on to co-star in a number of 1930s Universal horror films including Frankenstein and The Vampire Bat. Jean Hersholt later starred in a number of MGM horror films, including The Mask of Fu Manchu and Mark of the Vampire.

References

External links

1923 mystery films
1920s English-language films
American silent feature films
American mystery films
Films directed by Clarence G. Badger
American black-and-white films
Goldwyn Pictures films
Rail transport films
Silent mystery films
1920s American films